A Piece of My Heart is a  Swedish jukebox musical film directed by Edward af Sillén and written by  based on music by Tomas Ledin. The title is taken from Ledin's Grammis award-winning song "En del av mitt hjärta". The lead role is played by Malin Åkerman, starring in her first Swedish film, with an ensemble cast featuring Christian Hillborg, Jonas Karlsson, Per Andersson, Shima Niavarani, Johan Ulveson, Johan Rheborg, and Marie Richardson. The film was produced and filmed in Sweden by Unlimited Stories. It was released on 25 December 2019.
When interviewed about the film, Ledin expressed how amazed he was by the quality of the script and how happy he was to be part of something like this. He also suggested that three or four of the songs are much better than his original. Af Sillén described the film as  an "all in-musical comedy" with a great ensemble and big, lavish shownumbers.

Plot 
The plot follows Isabella, a successful business woman in the financial district of Stockholm, who returns to her small-town home to celebrate her father's birthday, only to find her teenage crush is marrying her childhood best friend. She also realises that her successful dealings in Stockholm will cause the closing of an important local industry.

Cast 
 Malin Åkerman as Isabella
 Lovisa Bengtsson as young Isabella
 Christian Hillborg as Simon
 Egon Ebbersten as young Simon
 Shima Niavarani as Molly
 Náthalie Andersson as young Molly
 Per Andersson as Kristoffer
 Jonas Karlsson as Edvin
 Marie Richardson as Greta
 Johan Rheborg as The Boss
 Johan Ulveson as Rune

Release 
A Piece of My Heart was released on 25 December 2019 in Sweden. Nordisk Film will look after the Scandinavia roll-out, with the release in Finland set for 3 January 2020.

On 25 October 2019, it was announced that Björn Ulvaeus has arranged an English dub of the film. He worked with Swedish songwriter Andreas Carlsson to produce English versions of Ledin's songs, recorded by the original Swedish cast. In November 2019, private previews of the English version were screened for invited guests in the hope of establishing a further international release. Ledin asked Ulvaeus if he would be interested in writing English lyrics for his songs as they are long time friends. The film's release in Israel, Taiwan and Poland is already confirmed.

Reception

Accolades

References

External links 

2019 romantic comedy-drama films
2019 films
Films based on works by Swedish writers
2010s Swedish-language films
Films set in Sweden
Jukebox musical films
2010s musical comedy-drama films
2010s romantic musical films
Swedish musical comedy-drama films
Swedish romantic comedy-drama films
Swedish romantic musical films
Swedish Christmas films
Films about weddings
Films shot in Sweden
Films based on songs
Films about music and musicians
2010s Christmas comedy-drama films
2019 comedy films
2019 drama films
2010s Swedish films